Revere is an unincorporated community in Madison County, North Carolina, United States.  It is also known as Sodom and Sodom Laurel.

Name origin
The community was originally named Sodom.  During the Civil War, a Baptist preacher travelling through the area commented on a group of prostitutes and compared it to Sodom in the Bible.

Presbyterian missionaries disliked this name, and officially changed the name to Revere.  However, natives of the area continue to use the name Sodom.

Music
Revere is particularly rich in ballad singers, and noted folklorist Cecil Sharp transcribed several "Old World" ballads sung to him in 1916.  In 2001, Rob Amberg published a book Sodom Laurel Album that chronicles the traditions and lifestyle in Revere.  Residents and folk singers Dellie Norton, Doug Wallin, and Sheila Kay Adams are featured in the book.

References

Unincorporated communities in Madison County, North Carolina
Unincorporated communities in North Carolina